Pasta mollicata (pasta with breadcrumbs) is a traditional Basilicata dish that is prepared all over the South of Italy. Compared to other pasta recipes, it is considered a "poor dish” because it is not prepared with many ingredients.

Preparation
Pasta mollicata is usually made by frying a chopped onion (previously dipped in red wine) in a cooking pan with extra-virgin olive oil and a bit of lard. A chopped tomato is then added to the mixture and cooked on high heat for several minutes. Afterwards, some stale bread reduced to crumbs is added and the pan is left on high heat for about 15 minutes. After draining the salty pasta and stir frying it with a bit of cacioricotta cheese, the dish is seasoned with more fresh cacioricotta, oil and some hot pepper.

Seasonal variations
Pasta mollicata, like other “poor dishes”, has many seasonal variations. Particular preparations include replacing onions with fresh leeks. There are also some preparations in which chopped nuts and/or fresh mushrooms are added to the basic seasoning.

References

Pasta dishes
Cuisine of Basilicata